Nachmanoff is a surname. Notable people with the surname include:

Dave Nachmanoff (born 1964), American folk singer-songwriter 
Jeffrey Nachmanoff (born 1967), American screenwriter and director